Following the 1790 Census, Massachusetts's representation increased from eight to fourteen Representatives and was redistricted into four plural districts, plus a single at-large district. The  covered the District of Maine (the modern-day State of Maine).

As before, a majority was required for election, in those districts where a majority was not achieved, additional ballots were required.

|-
| 
| colspan=3 | None (District created)
|  | New seat.New member elected.Anti-Administration gain.
| nowrap | First ballot :Jonathan Jones 39.8%William Heath 31.0%James Bowdoin 23.2%Theophilus Parsons 6.0%Second ballot :Jonathan Jones 29.3%Samuel Holten (Anti-Admin) 25.6%James Bowdoin 17.1%Samuel Sewall (Pro-Admin) 13.1%William Heath 8.3%Joseph Bradley Varnum (Anti-Admin) 3.8%Elbridge Gerry (Anti-Admin) 2.8%Third ballot :√ Samuel Holten (Anti-Admin) 69.9%Benjamin Austin 30.1%

|-
| 
| Benjamin Goodhue
|  | Pro-Administration
| nowrap | 1789
| Incumbent re-elected.
| nowrap | √ Benjamin Goodhue (Pro-Admin) 100%

|-
| 
| Elbridge Gerry
|  | Anti-Administration
| nowrap | 1789
|  | Incumbent lost re-election.New member elected.Pro-Administration gain.
| nowrap | √ Samuel Dexter (Pro-Admin) 61.4%Joseph Bradley Varnum (Anti-Admin) 26.2%Elbridge Gerry (Anti-Admin) 12.4%

|-
| 
| Fisher Ames
|  | Pro-Administration
| nowrap | 1788
| Incumbent re-elected.
| nowrap | √ Fisher Ames (Pro-Admin) 62.4%Benjamin Austin 37.6%

|-
| 
| colspan=3 | None (District created)
|  | New seat.New member elected.Pro-Administration gain.
| nowrap | First ballot :Samuel Lyman (Pro-Admin) 41.3%Theodore Sedgwick (Pro-Admin) 37.9%William Lyman (Anti-Admin) 6.7%Samuel Moorhaus 6.2%Simson Strong 4.%Dwight Foster (Pro-Admin) 3.5%Second ballot :Samuel Lyman (Pro-Admin) 35.4%Dwight Foster (Pro-Admin) 25.1%Thomson J. Skinner (Anti-Admin) 19.6%William Lyman (Anti-Admin) 12.1%Jonathan Grout (Anti-Admin) 4.0%William Shepard (Pro-Admin) 3.8%Third ballot :√ Dwight Foster (Pro-Admin) 55.3%Samuel Lyman (Pro-Admin) 44.7%

|-
| 
| Theodore Sedgwick
|  | Pro-Administration
| nowrap | 1789
| Incumbent re-elected.
| nowrap | √ Theodore Sedgwick (Pro-Admin) 63.8%Thomson J. Skinner (Anti-Admin) 29.1%John Bacon (Anti-Admin) 7.1%

|-
| 
| colspan=3 | None (District created)
|  | New seat.New member elected.Anti-Administration gain.
| nowrap | First ballot :Samuel Lyman (Pro-Admin) 37.4%William Lyman (Anti-Admin) 32.3%Thomas Dwight (Pro-Admin) 16.8%Samuel Hinshaur 6.7%John Williams 3.6%Dwight Foster (Pro-Admin) 3.1%Second ballot :William Lyman (Anti-Admin) 38.0%Samuel Lyman (Pro-Admin) 31.3%William Shepard (Pro-Admin) 18.0%Thomas Dwight (Pro-Admin) 12.7%Third ballot :√ William Lyman (Anti-Admin) 53.1%Samuel Lyman (Pro-Admin) 46.9%

|-
| 
| Artemas Ward
|  | Pro-Administration
| nowrap | 1790
| Incumbent re-elected.
| nowrap | √ Artemas Ward (Pro-Admin) 59.5%Jonathan Grout (Anti-Admin) 36.8%Dwight Foster (Pro-Admin) 3.8%

|-
| 
| George Leonard
|  | Pro-Administration
| nowrap | 1788
|  | Incumbent lost re-election.New member elected.Pro-Administration hold.
| nowrap | √ Peleg Coffin, Jr. (Pro-Admin) 52.6%George Leonard (Pro-Admin) 34.3%Phanuel Bishop (Anti-Admin) 13.1%

|-
| 
| Shearjashub Bourne
|  | Pro-Administration
| nowrap | 1790
| Incumbent re-elected.
| nowrap | First ballot :John Davis 49.2%Shearjashub Bourne (Pro-Admin) 26.1%James Warren 24.8%Second ballot :√ Shearjashub Bourne (Pro-Admin) 53.0%John Davis 40.6%James Warren 6.4%

|-
| 
| colspan=3 | None (District created)
|  | New seat.New member elected.Pro-Administration gain.
| nowrap | First ballot :Daniel Davis 40.0%Peleg Wadsworth (Pro-Admin) 38.6%Robert Southgate 11.7%Josiah Thacker 9.8%Second ballot :Peleg Wadsworth (Pro-Admin) 48.4%Daniel Davis 42.2%Robert Southgate 9.4%Third ballot :√ Peleg Wadsworth (Pro-Admin) 58.0%Daniel Davis 42.0%

|-
| 
| colspan=3 | None (District created)
|  | New seat.New member elected.Anti-Administration gain.
| nowrap | First ballot :William Lithgow 49.98%Henry Dearborn (Anti-Admin) 32.2%Daniel Coney 11.8%Alan Campbell 6.0%Second ballot :√ Henry Dearborn (Anti-Admin) 60.9%William Lithgow 39.1%

|-
| 
| George Thatcher
|  | Pro-Administration
| nowrap | 1788
| Incumbent re-elected.
| nowrap | √ George Thatcher (Pro-Admin) 57.7%Nathaniel Wells 35.4%Tristan Jordan 6.9%

|-
| 
| colspan=3 | None (District created)
|  | New seat.New member elected.Pro-Administration gain.
| nowrap | √ David Cobb (Pro-Admin) 52.6%Charles Jarvis 9.6%William Heath 6.9%Theodore Sedgwick (Pro-Admin) 4.9%Elbridge Gerry (Anti-Admin) 2.1%Jonathan Jones 1.9%Fisher Ames (Pro-Admin) 1.7%James Sullivan (Anti-Admin) 1.5%Samuel Horton 1.3%Scattering 17.4%

|}

See also 
 United States House of Representatives elections, 1792 and 1793
 List of United States representatives from Massachusetts

United States House of Representatives elections in Massachusetts
Massachusetts
Massachusetts
United States House of Representatives
United States House of Representatives